Sheikhpur is a village in Ballia district, Uttar Pradesh, India, (formerly in the District of Azam Garh, UP).

References

Cities and towns in Ballia district
Medieval Islamic world